Mountains are listed according to various criteria:
 List of mountains by elevation
 List of highest unclimbed peaks
 List of volcanoes by elevation
 Topographic prominence
 List of mountain peaks by prominence
 Ultra-prominent peak
 Summits farthest from the Earth's center
 Lists of highest points restricted to a specific geographic area
List of countries by highest point
List of islands by highest point
 Lists of mountains by region sorted by country or province
 Seven Summits, the highest peak on each continent
 Seven Second Summits, the second-highest peak on each continent
 List of mountain types sorted by geological origin
 List of mountain ranges organized into mountain ranges

See also
 List of mountain lists, including lists for peakbaggers